Gabriele Maruotti (born ) is a former Italian male volleyball player. He was part of the Italy men's national volleyball team. On club level he played for Piemonte volley.

References

External links
 Gabriele Maruotti at the International Volleyball Federation
 

1988 births
Living people
People from Fiumicino
Italian men's volleyball players
Place of birth missing (living people)
Mediterranean Games medalists in volleyball
Mediterranean Games gold medalists for Italy
Competitors at the 2009 Mediterranean Games
Sportspeople from the Metropolitan City of Rome Capital